Gun Talk is a 1947 American Western film directed by Lambert Hillyer and written by J. Benton Cheney. The film stars Johnny Mack Brown, Raymond Hatton, Christine McIntyre, Douglas Evans, Geneva Gray and Wheaton Chambers. The film was released on December 20, 1947, by Monogram Pictures.

Plot

Cast          
Johnny Mack Brown as Johnny McVey
Raymond Hatton as Lucky Danvers
Christine McIntyre as Daisy Cameron
Douglas Evans as Rod Jackson
Geneva Gray as June Forbes
Wheaton Chambers as Herkimer Stone
Frank LaRue as Simpson 
Ted Adams as Tim 
Carl Mathews as Pepper 
Zon Murray as Nolan
Cactus Mack as Marshal Wetherby
Carol Henry as Burke
Bill Hale as Joe 
Boyd Stockman as Red Diggs 
Roy Butler as Gus 
Bob McElroy as Pete

References

External links
 

1947 films
American Western (genre) films
1947 Western (genre) films
Monogram Pictures films
Films directed by Lambert Hillyer
American black-and-white films
1940s English-language films
1940s American films